The London Tea Auction was a candle auction of tea, that ran regularly for over 300 years from 1679 until its closure on 29 June 1998. The auction made London the centre for tea's international trade.  The East India Company held the first auction in Leadenhall Street and then in 1834 - after the East India Company ceased to be a commercial enterprise - the auction was held on Mincing Lane.

External links
 eBook: Denys Forrest, Tea for the British (London, 1973).
 eBook: Anonymous ('A Tea Dealer') Tsiology; A discourse on tea &c &c 
 Business: The Economy - Storm in a teacup 
 London tea auction abandoned - The candle that was lit in 1750 will be extinguished in June 1998
 Britain's great tea ceremony ends after 300 years
 Audio: Tea Auction 1936
 'By the Candle'

1679 establishments in England
Tea auctions
Tea in the United Kingdom